Henry Parker (1849–unknown) was a British engineer in colonial Ceylon during the Victorian era. He was attached to the Irrigation Department from 1873 to 1904. During his work as an engineer he developed an admiration for the skills displayed by the ancient Sinhalese at the time of the construction of their reservoirs.

Parker is renowned for having studied and compiled the folklore of Sri Lanka, becoming an authority on the subject. 
He was the author of two books:  
Ancient Ceylon, London-Luzac & Co., First Published by the India Office (1909), is an account of the aboriginal and early civilization of Sri Lanka 
Village Folk-Tales of Ceylon. A voluminous compilation of folk tales collected and translated by the author.

See also
Ancient constructions of Sri Lanka
Irrigation works in ancient Sri Lanka

References

External links
Village Folk Tales of Ceylon, Vol. 1 Vol. 2 Vol. 3
Sri Lanka Ancient Irrigation
Symbolism on Ancient Sri Lankan Coins
Gananath Obeyesekere, Colonial Histories and Vädda Primitivism 

Year of birth unknown
Year of death unknown
British Ceylon
British ethnologists
Sri Lankan folklore
Henry
British Sanskrit scholars